Stanley J. Davis (May 8, 1908January 23, 2003) was a Michigan politician.

Early life
Davis was born in Poland on May 8, 1908. Davis graduated from Grand Rapids Union High School and took extension courses at the University of Michigan.

Career
Davis was a florist. Davis served as mayor of Grand Rapids, Michigan from 1949 to 1950. In 1950, was the unsuccessful Democratic candidate for the Michigan Senate seat representing the 17th district. Davis once again served as the mayor of Grand Rapids from 1958 to 1963 after unsuccessfully running for the position in 1956. In 1961, Davis was an unsuccessful candidate for the position of delegate to Michigan state constitutional convention from Kent County 1st District. On November 4, 1964, Davis was elected to the Michigan House of Representatives where he represented the 92nd district from January 13, 1965 to 1972. Davis was not re-elected to this position in 1972, and once again was defeated in an election for the same position in 1974.

Personal life
Davis was married to Gladys M. Werkema. Together they had three children. Davis was a member of the Elks and the Knights of Columbus. Davis was a member of the St. James Roman Catholic Church.

Death
Davis died on January 23, 2003.

References

1908 births
2003 deaths
Catholics from Michigan
Mayors of Grand Rapids, Michigan
Polish emigrants to the United States
Democratic Party members of the Michigan House of Representatives
20th-century American politicians